Nikolai Aleksandrovich Tretyakov (2 October 1854 – 5 February 1917) was a military engineer and general in the Imperial Russian Army, noted for his heroic role in the Siege of Port Arthur during the Russo-Japanese War.

Biography
Tretyakov was born in Simbirsk, where his family were members of the local nobility. He graduated from the 2nd Moscow Military Gymnasium on August 10, 1872 and entered military service. In 1875, after graduation from the Nikolaev Engineering School, he was commissioned as a second lieutenant. He was promoted to lieutenant on July 13, 1877 and returned to the Nikolaev Academy of Engineering from which he graduated in 1878, and was subsequently promoted to captain. He became a lieutenant colonel in April 1892, and was assigned command of a sapper company at Vladivostok in April 1893. On May 21, 1895 he became commander of the 1st East Siberian Demining Brigade.

Promoted to colonel on December 25, 1899, Tretyakov was with the Russian expeditionary forces in the Boxer Rebellion in northern China. On February 27, 1901, he was appointed commander of the 5th East Siberian Rifles regiment.

During the Russo-Japanese War of 1904-1905, Tretyakov distinguished himself with a heroic defense against the Imperial Japanese Army at the Battle of Nanshan, during which he was wounded. He was promoted to major general on October 22, 1904 and continued to command the 5th East Siberian Rifles throughout the Siege of Port Arthur.
 
After the end of the war, on October 17, 1910, Tretyakov became inspector of field engineering in the Kiev Military District. He was promoted to lieutenant general on December 6, 1910. He was made commander of the 10th Siberian Rifle Division on February 28, 1911 and of the 3rd Siberian Infantry Division on October 12, 1911.

At the start of World War I, from August 12, 1914 Tretyakov was in command of the 1st Siberian Infantry Division. He was appointed commander of the Russian 23rd Army Corps on September 5, 1915, but asked to be transferred to the reserves only a week later. In December 1915,  he was appointed commander of the Russian XLII Army Corps, and on March 20, 1916 to that of the Russian XXXVII Army Corps. He was promoted to Engineer-general, (a military-technical rank in the Imperial Russian Army), on December 6, 1916.

Tretyakov died of pneumonia on February 27, 1917.

Awards
 Order of St. Stanislaus  3rd degree with swords and bow, 1879
 Order of St. Anne 3rd degree 1880
 Order of St. Stanislaus 2nd degree 1887.
 Order of St. Anne 2nd degree, 1891
 Order of St Vladimir 4th degree, 1895.
Gold Sword for Bravery, 1901
 Order of St Vladimir, 3rd degree with swords, 1903
 Order of St. George, 4th class, 1904
 Order of St. Stanislaus  1st degree with sword, 1905
 Order of St. Anne 1st degree with swords, 1907
 Order of St Vladimir, 2nd degree, 1913
 Order of the White Eagle, with swords, 1916
 Order of St. Anne 4th degree, 1916

References

 Connaughton, Richard (2003). Rising Sun and Tumbling Bear. Cassell. 
 Jukes, Geoffry. The Russo-Japanese War 1904–1905.  Osprey Essential Histories. (2002).  .
 Kowner, Rotem (2006). Historical Dictionary of the Russo-Japanese War. Scarecrow. 

1854 births
1917 deaths
Imperial Russian Army generals
People of the Boxer Rebellion
Russian military personnel of the Russo-Japanese War
Russian people of World War I
Recipients of the Order of Saint Stanislaus (Russian), 1st class
Recipients of the Order of St. Anna, 1st class
Recipients of the Order of St. Vladimir, 2nd class
Recipients of the Gold Sword for Bravery
Deaths from pneumonia in Russia
Russian military engineers
Recipients of the Order of the White Eagle (Poland)